Leif Eriksson is an outdoor statue by Anne Whitney at the west end of the Commonwealth Avenue Mall in Boston, Massachusetts, United States. Installed in 1887, it was the first public sculpture to honor the Norse explorer in the New World.

Description
The granite around the sculpture originally served as a fountain, but has since been converted to a flower bed. The work contains runes as well as the English inscription "Leif the Discoverer, Son of Erik, who sailed from Iceland and landed on this continent, AD 1000." It depicts Leif as a young man lifting his left hand in front of his brow. In a letter to the Boston Art Commission, the sculptor described the posture as a "man of the old world shading his vision against the glare of the new."

History
The memorial was commissioned by the baking powder magnate Eben Norton Horsford, prompted by conversations with Ole Bull and others, to promote the idea of Norse exploration of North America. Its dedication in October 1887 included a big parade through Boston Common to Faneuil Hall, where Governor Oliver Ames and other dignitaries spoke.

Whitney corresponded with Frederick Law Olmsted about the placement of the monument and its landscaping. It was later moved for a road realignment. The site was surveyed as part of the Smithsonian Institution's "Save Outdoor Sculpture!" program in 1993. Corrosion was treated in 2007 and an acrylic protective coating was applied.

Copies
Late in 1887 a copy, Leif, the Discoverer, was placed in Juneau Park in Milwaukee, Wisconsin.

Bertha Palmer requested the plaster cast of the statue for the 1893 World's Columbian Exposition. This was bronzed and displayed there, then later at the Smithsonian Institution, until it was placed in storage.

See also

 1885 in art
Statue of Leif Erikson (Chicago)
 Viking expansion

References

External links
 

1885 sculptures
1887 establishments in Massachusetts
Bronze sculptures in Massachusetts
Cultural depictions of Leif Erikson
Fountains in Massachusetts
Granite sculptures in Massachusetts
Monuments and memorials in Boston
Outdoor sculptures in Boston
Relocated buildings and structures in Massachusetts
Sandstone sculptures in the United States
Sculptures of men in Massachusetts
Statues in Boston
Statues of explorers